The Murder City Devils is the debut studio album by punk rock band Murder City Devils. It was recorded at Moon Studios, Olympia, and produced by Steve Wold. It was released in 1997 on Die Young Stay Pretty Records.

Critical reception
AllMusic gave the album a mixed review, writing: "A good choice for those interested in the progression of this rock outfit or those who prefer a stripped-down punk production, but not the rock & roll rampage of the later works."

Track listing 

Dance Hall Music - 1:19
It's In My Heart - 1:27
Boom Swagger Boom - 2:40
Get Off The Floor - 2:18
Flashbulb - 2:53
Broken Glass - 2:42
Murder City Riot - 1:21
Sick Of Dreaming - 1:40
Make It On My Own - 2:29
Tell You Brother - 3:27

References

1998 debut albums
Murder City Devils albums